Kimberly Orline Julsing (born 24 April 1998) is a German-Aruban model and beauty pageant titleholder who won the Miss Aruba 2018 on 7 June 2018. She represented Aruba at the Miss Universe 2018 pageant.

Personal life
Julsing lives in Daimari, Aruba. She studied at E.P.I Health & Service. She was awarded as Best of the Best Beauty World 2017.

Pageantry

Miss Aruba 2018
On 7 June 2018 Julsing was crowned Miss Aruba 2018 under new management in Aruba at the Alhambra Ballroom in Divi Resorts, Oranjestad.

Miss Universe 2018
Julsing represented Aruba at the Miss Universe 2018 later this year, but was unplaced.

References

External links
MissArubaPageant
Missuniverse.com

Living people
1998 births
Miss Universe 2018 contestants
Aruban beauty pageant winners
Aruban female models
German emigrants to the Netherlands